Robin Gill may refer to:

 Robin Gill (journalist) (born 1978), Canadian journalist
 Robin Gill (priest) (born 1944), British Anglican priest, theologian, and academic
 Robin D. Gill (born 1951), American Japanologist

See also
 Robin Gillett